A web page (or webpage) is a hypertext document on the World Wide Web. Web pages are delivered by a web server to the user and displayed in a web browser. A website consists of many web pages linked together under a common domain name. The name "web page" is a metaphor of paper pages bound together into a book.

Elements
The core element of a web page is a text file written in the HyperText Markup Language (HTML) that describes the content of the web page and includes references to other web resources. A web page is a structured document that primarily consists of hypertext, text with hyperlinks. Hyperlinks point the user to other web resources, primarily other web pages, and to different sections of the same web page. Multimedia content on the web, such as images, videos, and other web pages, can be directly embedded in a web page to form a compound document.

An HTML document can include Cascading Style Sheets (CSS) documents to describe the presentation of content on a web page. It can also include JavaScript or WebAssembly programs, which are executed by the web browser to add dynamic behavior to the web page. Web pages with dynamic behavior can function as application software, referred to as web applications.

Navigation 

Each web page is identified by a distinct Uniform Resource Locator (URL). When the user inputs the URL for a web page into their browser, the browser downloads an HTML file from a web server and transforms all of its elements into an interactive visual representation on the user's device.

If the user clicks, taps, or otherwise activates a hyperlink, the browser repeats this process to load the page pointed to by the hyperlink, which could be part of the current website or a different one. The browser has user interface features that indicate which page is displayed.

Deployment 
From the perspective of server-side website deployment, there are two types of web pages: static and dynamic. Static pages are retrieved from the web server's file system without any modification, while dynamic pages must be created by the server on the fly, typically reading from a database to fill out a template, before being sent to the user's browser.

See also 
 Single-page application
 Progressive web application
 Web Components

References 

Web design
Website management